Velayat Metro Station  is a station of Mashhad Metro Line 2. The station opened on 15 February 2017 and was named Tabarsi but later on the City Council decided to replace the names of station 1 and 2 of line 2. It is located on North Tabarsi Boulevard.

References

Mashhad Metro stations
Railway stations opened in 2017
2017 establishments in Iran